Aaron Keith (born June 23, 1971) is an American Para-cyclist who represented the United States at the 2020 Summer Paralympics.

Career
Keith represented the United States in the men's road time trial C1 event at the 2020 Summer Paralympics and won a silver medal.

Keith represented the United States at the 2022 UCI Para-cycling Track World Championships where he won a silver medal in the scratch race and individual pursuit events.

References

Living people
1971 births
American male cyclists
People from Woodinville, Washington
Cyclists at the 2020 Summer Paralympics
Medalists at the 2020 Summer Paralympics
Paralympic medalists in cycling
Paralympic silver medalists for the United States
Cyclists from Washington (state)
20th-century American people
21st-century American people